Love in Contract is a 2022 South Korean television series starring Park Min-young, Go Kyung-pyo, and Kim Jae-young. It aired from September 21 to November 10, 2022, on tvN's Wednesdays and Thursdays at 22:30 (KST) time slot.

Synopsis
The series is about the unusual job of a "single life helper" who becomes the spouse of single people needing partner to attend events such as couples' gatherings and reunions.

Cast and characters

Main
 Park Min-young as Choi Sang-eun: a single life helper with thirteen years of career who has the perfect looks, abilities and charm.
 Go Kyung-pyo as Jung Ji-ho: a mysterious man who has a long-term exclusive contract with Sang-eun for Mondays, Wednesdays and Fridays.
 Kim Jae-young as Kang Hae-jin: a chaebol family's youngest son and a hallyu star who has a new contract with Sang-eun for Tuesdays, Thursdays and Saturdays.

Supporting

People around Choi Sang-eun
 Kang Hyung-seok as Woo Kwang-nam
 Jin Kyung as Yoo Mi-ho
 Ahn Suk-hwan as Jung Gil-tae
 Kim Dong-hyun as Choi Sang-mu
 as Oh Cha-jang

People around Jung Ji-ho
 Bae Hae-sun as Kim Seong-mi
 Park Chul-min as a senior manager
 Park Kyung-hye as Kim Yu-mi
 Lee Taek-geun as Park Sang-gu

People around Kang Hae-jin
 Kim Hyun-mok as Yoo Jung-han
 Jung Seong-ho as Choi Chan-hee
 Oh Ryung as Kang Seon-jin
 Lee Seung-cheol as Kang Jin
 Yang Jung-a as Choi Ran-hee

Other
 Lee Joo-bin as Jung Ji-eun

Special appearances
 Nana as Yu-mi
 Yoon Ye-hee as Sang-eun's mother
 Go Geon-han as Lee Seon-ho
 Lee Seung-guk as a YouTuber

Production
Filming of the series started in May 2022, and continued filming for five months until  October 29.

Viewership

References

External links
  
 
 

Korean-language television shows
TVN (South Korean TV channel) television dramas
Television series by CJ E&M
South Korean romantic comedy television series
2022 South Korean television series debuts
2022 South Korean television series endings